Haoliners Animation League is a Chinese animation company based in Shanghai and established in 2013. Its subsidiary Animation Company Emon operates in Japan and South Korea, and Haoliners maintains a Korean animation branch as well.

The studio is currently owned by Chinese streaming service Bilibili.

Animation directors
Li Haoling
Wang Xin
Chen YeDong Yi

Works

Television series
A list of television series animated or co-animated by Haoliners Animation League or its subsidiaries.
Spiritpact (2017, animated by Haoliners Animation League Korea)
Evil or Live (2017–2018)
The Silver Guardian (2017–2018, second season co-animated with BLADE)
A Centaur's Life (2017)
To Be Heroine (2018, co-animated with Studio LAN)
Spiritpact: Bond of the Underworld (2018)

Original net animations
A list of ONAs animated or co-animated by Haoliners Animation League or its subsidiaries.
Mantou Diary (2013–2014, co-animated with Studio LAN)
Lu Shidai (2013–2014)
Duan Nao (2014–2015)
Yaoguai Mingdan (2014–2015)
Chinese Mystery Man (2014–2016, co-animated with Pb Animation)
School Shock (2015)
Fox Spirit Matchmaker (2015–present)
I’m Bai Xiaofei (2015–2016)
Yaoguai Mingdan 2 (2017)
Hitori no Shita: Second Season (2018)
Tong Ling Fei (2018–2019)
The Daily Life of the Immortal King (2020-present)
Heaven Official's Blessing (2020-present)
Legend of Exorcism (2020-present)
Link Click (2021-present, co-animated with Studio LAN)
Duan Nao 2 (TBA)

Other productions
A list of other productions Haoliners or its subsidiaries produced, but did not animate.
Congqian Youzuo Lingjianshan (2015–2016, animated by Studio Deen)
To Be Hero (2016, animated by Studio LAN)
Flavors of Youth (2018, co-production with CoMix Wave Films; animated by CoMix Wave Films)

References

External links

Official Japanese website 
Emon on Crunchyroll
Haoliners Animation on YouTube

 
Chinese animation studios
Chinese companies established in 2013
Companies based in Shanghai